The House of Rzewuski was an important Polish noble family (magnates) in the 17th century during the era of the Polish–Lithuanian Commonwealth.

History
The family originated from the village Bejdy near the town of Łosice in the Podlasie region. They used the Krzywda coat of arms. Members of the family received the title of Count and held several notable positions in the Polish–Lithuanian Commonwealth, most notably, that of a hetman (thrice).

Coat of arms

The Rzewuski family used the Krzywda Coat of Arms and their motto was "Qua via Virtutis".

Notable representatives
 Michał Florian Rzewuski (d. 1687) deputy voivode of Lwów, royal court podskarbi, starosta of Chełmno
 Seweryn Rzewuski (1743-1811), Field Crown Hetman
 Michał Józef Rzewuski (d. 1770), voivode of Podole
 Aleksandra Franciszka Rzewuska (1788-1865), artist
 Jadwiga Rzewuska (1843-1889), historical writer
 Adam Rzewuski (d. 1717), castellan of Podlasie
 Adam Rzewuski (1805-1888), landowner, Russian general
 Adam Wawrzyniec Rzewuski (1760-1825), Sejm deputy, political writer
 Ewelina Hańska, wife of Honoré de Balzac
 Franciszek Rzewuski (c. 1730-1800), Sejm deputy
 Maria Ludwika Rzewuska (1744–1816), wife of Jan Mikołaj Chodkiewicz 
 Franciszek Kazimierz Rzewuski (zm. 1683) stolnik of Podole, Sejm deputy
 Henryk Rzewuski (1791-1866), writer and essayist
 Jan Rzewuski (d. 1759), Podstoli of Lithuania
 Józef Rzewuski (1739-1816), Sejm deputy, general
 Teresa Karolina Rzewuska (1749–1787). wife of Karol Stanisław "Panie Kochanku" Radziwiłł 
 Kazimierz Rzewuski (c. 1750-1820), Sejm deputy
 Leons Rzewuski (1808-1869), publicist
 Stanisław Beydo Rzewuski (d. 1668), judge, Sejm deputy
 Stanisław Rzewuski (1806-1831), historian of philosophy and literature
 Stanisław Rzewuski (1864-1913), writer
 Stanisław Ferdynand Rzewuski (1737-1786), starosta chełmski, Sejm deputy
 Stanisław Mateusz Rzewuski (1662-1728), Grand Crown Hetman
 Walery Rzewuski (1837-1888), early portrait photographer, alderman of Kraków
 Stefan Rzewuski 1893-1954
 Wacław Piotr Rzewuski (1706-1779), Grand Crown Hetman
 Wacław Seweryn Rzewuski (1784-1831), traveler
 Tadeusz Rzewuski (1905-1995), President of the Free Poles in France
 Alex-Ceslas Rzewuski (1892-1983), priest and writer

Palaces

References

 Dworzaczek Włodzimierz, Genealogia, Warszawa 1959
 Lenczewski Tomasz, Genealogie rodów utytułowanych w Polsce, t. I, Warszawa 1995-1996

External links
 http://www.wilanow-palac.pl/rzewuscy_zarys_dziejow_rodu.html